Quest is a 2017 documentary film following a north-Philadelphia family over eight years.

Synopsis

Quest follows the north-Philadelphia Rainey family over eight years.

Release
Quest premiered on January 22, 2017 at the Sundance Film Festival. It was also screened at the True/False Film Festival and the Zurich Film Festival, among others. It was released theatrically on December 8, 2017. After its theatrical release, it was aired on the PBS show POV.

Critical response
Quest was met with positive reviews from critics during its festival screenings. Guy Lodge of Variety gave the film a positive review, writing that director Olshefski and editor Utz "beautifully [carve] out a film that feels at once narratively firm and organically shaped from over 300 hours of footage across the years." Brian Tallerico, writing for RogerEbert.com, wrote that Quest "transcends that simple set-up to feel like something greater through the marvelous likability and relatability of the Raineys."

On review aggregator website Rotten Tomatoes, the film has a "certified fresh" approval rating of 98% based on 60 reviews, and an average rating of 7.88/10. The website's critical consensus reads, "Simultaneously sweeping and intimate, Quest uses one family's experiences to offer trenchant, wide-ranging observations about modern American life." On Metacritic, the film has a weighted average score of 88 out of 100, based on 18 critics, indicating "universal acclaim".

Quest was nominated for the 2018 Independent Spirit Award for Best Documentary Feature. After airing on television, Quest was nominated for the 2019 News and Documentary Emmy Award for Outstanding Documentary and Outstanding Social Issue Documentary.

References

External links

Quest on POV

2017 films
2010s English-language films
2017 documentary films
American documentary films
Films shot in Philadelphia
2010s American films